Sandra Žigić (born 19 January 1988) is a Croatian footballer who plays as a defender for Italian Serie B club Orobica.

Club career
She played for Dinamo Maksimir (with which she also played the European Cup) and Plamen Križevci in the Croatian 1st Division, FC St. Veit in the Austrian Frauenliga, the Monroe Mustangs in the NJCAA and Medyk Konin in the Polish Ekstraliga.

She left Jena in the SUmmer 2018 and joined newly formed A.C. Milan Women.

International career
She made her debut for the Croatian national team in May 2005, and she is one of Croatia's most experienced player with 89 international appearances as of February 2020.

References

External links
 
 

1988 births
Living people
Croatian women's footballers
Croatia women's international footballers
Croatian expatriate sportspeople in Germany
Expatriate women's footballers in Austria
Expatriate women's soccer players in the United States
Expatriate women's footballers in Poland
Medyk Konin players
FF USV Jena players
Monroe Mustangs women's soccer players
Women's association football defenders
A.C. Milan Women players
Expatriate women's footballers in Italy
Serie A (women's football) players
Croatian expatriate women's footballers
Croatian expatriate sportspeople in Italy
ÖFB-Frauenliga players
Croatian Women's First Football League players
ŽNK Osijek players
ŽNK Dinamo-Maksimir players
Croatian expatriate sportspeople in Austria
Croatian expatriate sportspeople in the United States
Croatian expatriate sportspeople in Poland
Expatriate women's footballers in Germany
Footballers from Zagreb
Frauen-Bundesliga players